Booksmart is a 2019 American comedy film directed by Olivia Wilde (in her feature directorial debut) and written by Emily Halpern, Sarah Haskins, Susanna Fogel, and Katie Silberman. It stars Beanie Feldstein and Kaitlyn Dever as two graduating high school girls who set out to finally break the rules and party on their last day of classes. Jessica Williams, Lisa Kudrow, Will Forte, and Jason Sudeikis also star. 

The film had its world premiere at South by Southwest on March 10, 2019 and was theatrically released in the United States on May 24, by United Artists Releasing. It received critical acclaim and grossed $25 million against a $6 million budget. For her performance, Feldstein was nominated for Best Actress – Comedy or Musical at the 77th Golden Globe Awards.

Plot

High school seniors Amy and Molly, longtime best friends, are accomplished students but, with Molly being class president, not popular with their peers.
Amy has a crush on a girl named Ryan, which Molly urges her to pursue.
On the eve of graduation, Molly confronts classmates insulting her bookishness, telling them she got into Yale, but they reveal that, despite their partying, they also got into prestigious colleges or job recruitments.
Furious, Molly tells Amy they should have enjoyed their time in high school more, and Amy reluctantly agrees to go to a graduation party held by classmate Nick.

Not knowing the party's address, Molly calls Jared, a wealthy classmate who likes her.
He instead takes them to his own party aboard a yacht.
Only his drug-crazed friend Gigi is there, who feeds the girls strawberries before jumping off the yacht.
Amy suggests they go home, but Molly calls a "Malala", their code for unconditionally supporting what the other wants to do.

The girls call a rideshare car and are shocked to be picked up by their principal, Jordan Brown.
To prepare Amy for possible sex with Ryan, Molly insists they watch pornography, which accidentally plays through the car speakers.
Brown drops them off at what they think is Nick's party, but it is the home of their classmate George, who is hosting a murder mystery party.
They again encounter Gigi, who reveals that the strawberries were laced with hallucinogens, whenupon they trip that they are plastic fashion dolls.
They leave George's house, but Gigi reveals Molly secretly likes Nick.

Amy insists they press on so that Molly can pursue her crush on Nick.
They see pizza boxes in an online video of Nick's party and acquire the address by threatening the pizza delivery man.
With only 2% phone battery, Molly calls their favorite teacher, Miss Fine, who gives them a ride to Nick's party.

Once there, they are surprised to find they are warmly welcomed.
Molly and Nick flirt over beer pong and Amy spends time with Ryan.
Amy finds Ryan making out with Nick.
Heartbroken, she finds Molly and calls her own "Malala", which Molly refuses because she still thinks she has a chance with Nick.
Amy angrily reveals she is not just spending the summer in Botswana but taking an entire gap year because she resents how Molly always tries to control her life.
The two argue in front of the entire party.

Amy runs to the bathroom, finding her classmate Hope.
They are initially argumentative until Amy kisses her.
They start to have sex, until Amy vomits on Hope.
Jared and Molly have a heartfelt conversation about how no-one at school really knows them.
Cops arrive at the party and everyone scatters.
Unable to find Amy, Molly is driven home by "Triple A", a popular student with a promiscuous reputation.
They bond over the stereotyping they have both endured.

Waking up on graduation day, Molly checks her phone and discovers her classmates praising Amy for creating a diversion at the party, allowing everyone to escape the police while getting herself arrested.
Molly visits Amy in jail and apologizes for her manipulative actions, and they reconcile.
Learning the pizza delivery man is a serial killer, they trade information to free Amy, and take Jared's car to graduation.
Molly kisses Jared onstage and gives an improvised valedictorian speech, receiving a standing ovation.

A few days later, as Molly helps Amy prepare for her trip to Botswana, Hope visits to give Amy her phone number.
Molly drives Amy to the airport where they share a tearful goodbye, but then Amy decides she still has time to hang out before her flight, so they ecstatically decide to get pancakes.

Cast

Production

Development
An early version of the children's book, Kate and Mona in the Jungle by Amy Aitken, was circulated in 2009 and appeared on the 2009 Black List; in 2014 Susanna Fogel revised the screenplay, rewriting one lead character as a lesbian and revising the story so the girls are not seeking boyfriends for the prom, but are going to an after-prom party. Aitken died in 2017 of breast cancer.

Following the revisions, Annapurna Pictures purchased the screenplay and approached Gloria Sanchez Productions to produce it; Gloria Sanchez' Jessica Elbaum pitched the screenplay to Olivia Wilde, who read the screenplay and two days later expressed admiration for it. Megan Ellison, Chelsea Bernard, David Distenfeld, Will Ferrell, Adam McKay, and Elbaum would serve as producers on the film. Screenwriter Katie Silberman was hired for more revisions in spring 2018, and to update the story. Silberman explored a new concept:

According to Silberman, "Olivia's mantra to all of us was that high school is war". Wilde also envisioned "a drug trip where the girls turned into Barbie dolls" and gave Silberman the responsibility of where to incorporate it into the story.

Casting
In February 2018, Kaitlyn Dever and Beanie Feldstein joined the cast of the film. In May 2018, Billie Lourd and Skyler Gisondo joined the cast of the film. That same month, Jason Sudeikis, Lisa Kudrow, Jessica Williams, Will Forte, Mike O'Brien, Mason Gooding, Noah Galvin, Diana Silvers, Austin Crute, Eduardo Franco, Molly Gordon, and Nico Hiraga joined the cast of the film.

Silvers was initially asked to audition for Ryan, but felt her appearance was not ideal for the character and auditioned for Hope instead. Wilde also urged Feldstein and Dever to live together to develop a rapport. The two actresses were roommates in Los Angeles for ten weeks. Wilde also asked the cast to read the screenplay and signal if they found dialogue that felt "inauthentic ... [and] rewrite it in your own voice". Silberman continued to write after casting, finding it easy to come up with dialogue to fit Feldstein and Dever. Silberman particularly credited the complementary language the characters use to Feldstein, who frequently posted "I have no breath" to Instagram. Wilde joked that her relationship with Sudekis was his audition.

Filming
Principal photography began in May 2018 around the San Fernando Valley. As a working mother, Wilde found the night filming challenging, but in the morning after filming she would take the time to bring her children to school. The effort wasn't something she could keep up in the long run, but having achieved her dream of getting to direct she was determined to "give it my all and make it work."

Wilde and production designer Katie Byron decorated the bedrooms seen in the film, including with trophies and depictions of prominent American women Michelle Obama and Ruth Bader Ginsburg.

 
The animated dolls sequence was created over five months by a team of thirty people. Wilde had voiced a character on the series BoJack Horseman and contacted ShadowMachine the animation studio behind BoJack to create the sequence. Due to script rewrites, parts of the animated scene involving a Roomba and a scene showing glitter vomit were cut from the film.

Music 
The score for Booksmart was composed by Dan the Automator. Although he had assisted with the scores of Scott Pilgrim vs. the World (2010) and Money Monster (2016), Booksmart was the first full film score that Dan composed for a major US film.

Release

Booksmart premiered at the South by Southwest film festival on March 10, 2019. It was then released theatrically in the United States on May 24, 2019 by Annapurna Pictures under its United Artists label. United Artists also utilized an Instagram campaign to sell tickets to a total of 800 advanced screenings across the country on May 17, 2019. While some film analysts predicted that Booksmart would have its theatrical release in the fall, following the trend of previous R-rated, female-centered films Lady Bird and The Edge of Seventeen, Annapurna decided on a wide release over Memorial Day weekend in order to build on the word-of-mouth traction they had generated from the festival premiere. Booksmart was released on digital download on August 20, 2019, and on DVD and Blu-ray on September 3, 2019.

Reception

Box office 
Booksmart grossed $22.7 million in the United States and Canada, and $2.2 million in other territories, for a worldwide total of $24.9 million.

In the United States and Canada, Booksmart was released alongside Aladdin and Brightburn, and was projected to gross around $12 million from 2,505 theaters in its four-day opening weekend. The film made $2.5 million on its first day, including $875,000 from Thursday night previews. It ended up underperforming, debuting to just $6.9 million (a four-day total of $8.7 million), finishing in sixth place. Industry publications insisted that although the targeted young female demographic did turn out to the film, it should have begun with a limited release and expanded, similar to the R-rated, female-led high school comedy Lady Bird in 2017, and that Booksmart failed to stand out in the crowded marketplace. In its second weekend the film made $3.3 million, dropping 52% and finishing in eighth.

The film's largest market outside North America was the United Kingdom, where it grossed around US$1.8 million (£1.5 million) after seven weeks in theaters.

Director J. J. Abrams asked: "When you have a movie that's as entertaining, well-made, and well-received as Booksmart not doing the business it should have [the teen comedy underperforming at the box office despite critics' raves], it really makes you realize that the typical Darwinian fight to survive is completely lopsided now. Everyone's trying to figure out how we protect the smaller films that aren't four-quadrant mega-releases. Can they exist in the cinema?"

Critical response
The website's critics consensus reads, "Fast-paced, funny, and fresh, Booksmart does the seemingly impossible by adding a smart new spin to the coming-of-age comedy." On Metacritic, the film has a weighted average score of 84 out of 100, based on 52 critics, indicating "universal acclaim". Audiences polled by CinemaScore gave the film an average grade of "B+" on an A+ to F scale, while those at PostTrak gave it an overall positive score of 80%. In December 2019, Rotten Tomatoes named Booksmart the #1 comedy of the decade on the site, using an adjusted formula that weighed multiple factors, including a film's release year and number of reviews.

Peter Debruge of Variety praised the ensemble cast as well as Wilde's direction, calling the film "the best high school buddy comedy since Superbad". John DeFore of The Hollywood Reporter called the film a "hilarious, blazingly paced teen comedy." Writing for the Chicago Sun-Times, Richard Roeper gave the film three-and-a-half stars out of four, calling it a "refreshingly original take on the raunchy coming-of-age comedy" and praising Feldstein and Dever's chemistry. Alissa Wilkinson of Vox awarded the film a score of four out of five, writing that the "memorably relatable" Booksmart is also a "delightful reminder that growing up is about realizing nobody's a stereotype".

Linda Holmes of NPR gave an especially favorable review, calling the film "a humane and heartfelt film without a mean bone in its figurative body". Vultures Emily Yoshida also favorably wrote that it "manages to be inclusive and progressive, without being precious about anything or sacrificing an ounce of humor". A. O. Scott of The New York Times regarded the film as "sharp but not mean, warm without feeling too soft or timid", and referring to Feldstein and Dever as "a classic comedy duo". Joe Morgenstern of The Wall Street Journal deemed Booksmart a "prodigy", stating that no film that was "funnier, smarter, quicker or more joyous has graced the big screen in a long time."

Accolades
Booksmart was included on 68 critics' top-ten lists, and on two lists was ranked in first place.

Notes

References

External links

 
 

2019 films
2010s buddy comedy films
2010s coming-of-age comedy films
2010s female buddy films
2010s high school films
2019 LGBT-related films
2010s teen comedy films
American buddy comedy films
American coming-of-age comedy films
American female buddy films
Teen buddy films
American high school films
American teen comedy films
American teen LGBT-related films
Annapurna Pictures films
2010s English-language films
Films about parties
Films directed by Olivia Wilde
Films produced by Adam McKay
Films produced by Megan Ellison
Films produced by Will Ferrell
Films set in Los Angeles
Films shot in Los Angeles
Gloria Sanchez Productions films
2019 independent films
Lesbian-related films
LGBT-related buddy comedy films
LGBT-related coming-of-age films
Films with screenplays by Katie Silberman
2019 directorial debut films
English-language comedy films